The L-Mount Alliance is an alliance between Leica Camera AG, Panasonic and Sigma, launched on 25 September 2018, whereby Panasonic and Sigma will make use of the L-Mount standard initially developed by Leica and will offer cameras and lenses utilising this lens mount with improved firmware and full compatibility among these Alliance products.

On the same day, Panasonic announced its S1R and S1 full-frame L-mount cameras, and Sigma announced a full-frame L-mount camera using the company's unique Foveon sensor technology. Panasonic's cameras will launch with three new lenses, and Sigma will initially release the same L-mount variants of existing lenses as they are producing for the Sony E-mount.

Six cameras and 39 native lenses have been announced for the L-Mount by 2020.

See also
L-Mount
Lens range
Full-frame mirrorless interchangeable-lens camera

References

External links

Leica L-Mount page
Panasonic Lumix S series cameras

Lens mounts
L-mount cameras